Notts Pot is cave system on Leck Fell, Lancashire, England. It is described as 'the most concentrated vertical maze in Britain'.

References 

Caves of Lancashire
Caves of the Three Counties System